Antaeotricha tibialis is a moth in the family Depressariidae. It was described by Philipp Christoph Zeller in 1877. It is found in Brazil and Trinidad.

References

Moths described in 1877
tibialis
Moths of the Caribbean
Moths of South America